Årdal is a village in Hjelmeland municipality in Rogaland county, Norway. The village is located at the eastern end of the Årdalsfjorden at the mouth of the river Storåna. From 1859 until 1965, Årdal was the administrative centre of the municipality of Årdal.

Årdal's main industries are based on the mining of sand, crushed stone, and gravel.  About one million tons of those items are shipped each year from the port of Årdal. The village is also home to the historic Old Årdal Church and the newer Årdal Church.

References

Villages in Rogaland
Hjelmeland